Murgash Glacieris the 3.4 km long and 3.2 km wide glacier on Greenwich Island in the South Shetland Islands, Antarctica situated southeast of Yakoruda Glacier, south of Teteven Glacier, southwest of Traub Glacier and west-northwest of Bravo Glacier. It is bounded by 
Lloyd Hill on the northwest, Tile Ridge on the east and Hebrizelm Hill on the southeast, and drains southwards into Kramolin Cove in McFarlane Strait between Yovkov Point and Kaspichan Point.

The glacier is named after Murgash in the western Balkan Mountains, Bulgaria.

Location
Bulgarian mapping in 2005 and 2009.

See also
 List of glaciers in the Antarctic
 Glaciology

Maps
 L.L. Ivanov et al. Antarctica: Livingston Island and Greenwich Island, South Shetland Islands. Scale 1:100000 topographic map. Sofia: Antarctic Place-names Commission of Bulgaria, 2005.
 L.L. Ivanov. Antarctica: Livingston Island and Greenwich, Robert, Snow and Smith Islands. Scale 1:120000 topographic map.  Troyan: Manfred Wörner Foundation, 2009.  
 Antarctic Digital Database (ADD). Scale 1:250000 topographic map of Antarctica. Scientific Committee on Antarctic Research (SCAR). Since 1993, regularly upgraded and updated.
 L.L. Ivanov. Antarctica: Livingston Island and Smith Island. Scale 1:100000 topographic map. Manfred Wörner Foundation, 2017.

References
 Murgash Glacier SCAR Composite Gazetteer of Antarctica
 Bulgarian Antarctic Gazetteer. Antarctic Place-names Commission. (details in Bulgarian, basic data in English)

External links
 Murgash Glacier. Copernix satellite image

Glaciers of Greenwich Island